The Jazz Harpist is the debut studio album by American jazz harpist Dorothy Ashby released in 1957 by the Regent label.

Reception

Allmusic reviewed the album awarding it 4½ stars stating "Her first, and best, album has Frank Wess on flute".

A reviewer of Dusty Groove wrote 'Jazz harpist Dorothy Ashby has always had one of the most unusual sounds around – and even though it might sound a bit crazy at first, her mix of harp playing with tight jazzy backing is always a winning combination. This early album has Ms Ashby playing with a groovy little combo that includes Frank Wess on flute, Ed Thigpen on drums, and Wendell Marshall on bass. Even at this early age, Dorothy shows her writing skills well with the originals "Aeolian Groove, "Lamentation", and "Spicy" – and she does a nice job with the other standards she chooses to cover. A nice record, with a soulful sound that you wouldn't expect!"

Track listing 
All compositions by Dorothy Ashby except as indicated
 "Thou Swell" (Lorenz Hart, Richard Rodgers) -  4:02  
 "Stella by Starlight" (Ned Washington, Victor Young) - 3:09
 "Dancing on the Ceiling" (Hart, Rodgers) - 7:31
 "Aeolian Groove" - 4:16
 "Quietude" - 2:52
 "Spicy" - 3:41
 "Lamentation" - 4:03

Personnel 
Dorothy Ashby - harp
Frank Wess - flute
Eddie Jones (tracks 3, 6 & 7), Wendell Marshall (tracks 1, 2, 4 & 5) - bass
Ed Thigpen - drums

Production
Ozzie Cadena - supervisor
Rudy Van Gelder - engineer

References

External links
A Dorothy Ashby Discography

Dorothy Ashby albums
1957 albums
Albums recorded at Van Gelder Studio
Albums produced by Ozzie Cadena